Soulmate is a 2023 South Korean film directed by Min Yong-geun starring Kim Da-mi, Jeon So-nee and Byeon Woo-seok. The film, adapted from the Chinese film with the same name, deals with the essence of human relationships through 14 years of meeting and parting, friendship and love, longing and jealousy between two friends who first met at the age of 13. It was released theatrically on March 15, 2023.

Overview 
The film depicts the ups and downs of the relationship that two women born in 1988, Mi-so (Kim Da-mi) and Ha-eun (Jeon So-nee) go through as they grow up. The world between the two of them suffers a microscopic crack when Ha-eun starts her first love with her classmate Jin-woo (Byeon Woo-seok) in their late teens. The free-spirited Mi-so leaves for the city to pursue an adventurous life while Ha-eun stays in her hometown to lead a stable life, and the two gradually grow apart. The Chinese original setting, which emphasizes the physical distance between provinces and large cities, is newly implemented in Soulmate with Jeju Island as the background.

Cast

Main 
 Kim Da-mi as Mi-so
 Kim Soo-hyung as young Mi-so
 Jeon So-nee as Ha-eun
 Ryu Ji-an as young Ha-eun
 Byeon Woo-seok as Jin-woo

Supporting 
 Heo Ji-na as Mi-so's mother
 Jang Hye-jin as Ha-eun's mother
 Park Chung-seon as Ha-eun's father
 Nam Yoon-su as Mi-so's boyfriend
 Kang Mal-geum as a curator at an art museum
 Hyun Bong-sik as the owner of a fancy shop

References

External links
 
 
 

Upcoming films
2020s South Korean films
2020s Korean-language films
South Korean romantic drama films
Next Entertainment World films
Films based on Chinese novels
Remakes of Chinese films
Films set in Jeju
Films shot in Jeju